Charlevoix Municipal Airport  is a city-owned, public-use airport located one nautical mile (2 km) southwest of the central business district of Charlevoix, a city in Charlevoix County, Michigan, United States. It is mostly used for general aviation, but also offers passenger service to Beaver Island via Island Airways and Fresh Air Aviation.

As per Federal Aviation Administration records, the airport had 17,854 passenger boardings (enplanements) in calendar year 2008, 15,427 enplanements in 2009, and 14,966 in 2010. It is included in the Federal Aviation Administration (FAA) National Plan of Integrated Airport Systems for 2017–2021, in which it is categorized as a non primary commercial service facility.

Although most U.S. airports use the same three-letter location identifier for the FAA and IATA, Charlevoix Municipal Airport is assigned CVX by the FAA but has no designation from the IATA.

Facilities and aircraft 

It has two runways: 9/27 is 4,550 by 75 feet (1,387 x 23 m) with an asphalt surface and 4/22 is 1,280 by 200 feet (390 x 61 m) with a turf surface.

The airport has a city-run fixed-base operator that offers fuel, general maintenance, a crew lounge, a conference room, and more. An expanded fuel farm became operational at the airport in 2022 to accommodate a sharp increase in traffic.

For the 12-month period ending December 31, 2018, the airport had 30,000 aircraft operations, an average of 82 per day: 59% general aviation, 40% air taxi, and 2% military. At that time there were 18 aircraft based at this airport: 11 single-engine and 5 multi-engine airplanes as well as two jets.

Airlines and destinations

Accidents and incidents
On February 2, 2001, a Piper PA-34 Seneca collided with a runway light and snowbank while attempting to land in Charlevoix. The pilot reported that, during the landing roll, the aircraft veered right  because there was too much aileron into the right crosswind. The pilot neutralized the controls, at which point the aircraft's left wing was lifted before the whole plane veered left, sliding over ice and into the snow bank. The probable cause was found to be that the pilot failed to maintain directional control of the airplane due to inadequate compensation for the wind conditions.
On June 24, 2011, a Beechcraft Bonanza crashed into a garage in Charlevoix while attempting to land at the airport. Authorities found the aircraft had stalled due to inadequate airspeed during an improper missed instrument approach procedure.
On September 13, 2019, a plane crash-landed at Charlevoix Municipal after having problems with its landing gear following a flight from Beaver Island. None of the nine aboard were injured.

References

External links 

 Charlevoix Municipal Airport at City of Charlevoix website
   at Michigan Airport Directory
 Aerial image as of April 1999 from USGS The National Map
 

Airports in Michigan
Buildings and structures in Charlevoix County, Michigan
Transportation in Charlevoix County, Michigan